Streptomyces megasporus is a thermophilic bacterium species from the genus of Streptomyces. The strain SD5 of Streptomyces megasporus produces fibrinolytic enzymes.

See also 
 List of Streptomyces species

References

Further reading

External links
Type strain of Streptomyces megasporus at BacDive -  the Bacterial Diversity Metadatabase	

megasporus
Bacteria described in 1986